Long Reef may refer to:

 Long Reef (New South Wales), a prominent headland in the Northern Beaches of Sydney, Australia
 Longreef, an Australian rock band from Sydney